Kenneth Brian Frampton  (born 20 November 1930) is a British architect, critic and historian. He is the Ware Professor of Architecture at the Graduate School of Architecture, Planning, and Preservation at Columbia University, New York. He has been a permanent resident of the United States since the mid-1980s. Frampton is regarded as one of the world's leading historians of modernist architecture.

Biography
Frampton studied architecture at Guildford School of Art and the Architectural Association School of Architecture, London. Subsequently, he worked in Israel, with Middlesex County Council and Douglas Stephen and Partners (1961–66) in London, during which time he was also a visiting tutor at the Royal College of Art (1961–64), tutor at the Architectural Association (1961–63) and technical editor of the journal Architectural Design (AD) (1962–65). While working for Douglas Stephen and Partners he designed in 1960-62 the Corringham Building, an 8-story block of flats in Bayswater, London, the architecture of which is distinctively modernist; in 1998 it became protected as a listed building.

Frampton has also taught at Princeton University School of Architecture (1966–71) and the Bartlett School of Architecture, London, (1980). He has been a member of the faculty at Columbia University since 1972, and that same year he became a fellow of the Institute for Architecture and Urban Studies in New York (whose members also included Peter Eisenman, Manfredo Tafuri and Rem Koolhaas) and a co-founding editor of its magazine Oppositions.

In 2017 the Canadian Centre for Architecture, which holds Frampton's archive, held an exhibition titled Educating Architects: Four Courses by Kenneth Frampton that examined aspects of his teaching at Columbia University, that informed his key publications.

Frampton was appointed Commander of the Order of the British Empire (CBE) in the 2021 Birthday Honours for services to architecture.

In 2015, Frampton's library was acquired by the Department of Architecture, The University of Hong Kong.

Writings on architecture
Frampton is especially well known for his writing on twentieth-century architecture, and for his central role in the development of architectural phenomenology. His books include Modern Architecture: A Critical History (1980; revised 1985, 1992, 2007 and 2020) and Studies in Tectonic Culture (1995). Frampton achieved great prominence (and influence) in architectural education with his essay "Towards a Critical Regionalism" (1983) – though the term had already been coined by Alexander Tzonis and Liane Lefaivre. In this paper, he mounts a criticism toward globalisation, mass consumer culture and the impact that this has had on architecture. For Frampton, this represents a particularly salient issue within the modern movement, as it has pushed architecture toward mediocrity, sameness and limited urban form which lacks any kind of cultural celebration or diversity. To remedy this, Frampton argues that the adoption of a more critical regionalist approach is required in architecture, one that takes into account specific considerations to place, topography, climate, and culture.

Frampton's essay was included in the book The Anti-Aesthetic. Essays on Postmodern Culture, edited by Hal Foster, though Frampton is critical of postmodernism. Frampton's own position attempts to defend a version of modernism that looks to either critical regionalism or a 'momentary' understanding of the autonomy of architectural practice in terms of its own concerns with form and tectonics which cannot be reduced to economics (whilst conversely retaining a Leftist viewpoint regarding the social responsibility of architecture). He summed up his critical stance towards postmodernist architecture and its advocates' belief in the primacy of architecture as a language as follows:

In 2002 a collection of Frampton's writings over a period of 35 years was collated and published under the title Labour, Work, and Architecture. An English translation of his 2015 book, The Other Modern Movement, is due out in 2021. In addition to his own scholarly research and criticism, Frampton has frequently furthered the intellectual reach of his work through writing introductions, prefaces and forewords for other authors and publications on allied themes.

Select list of Frampton's writings 
"Towards a Critical Regionalism: Six Points for an Architecture of Resistance", in The Anti-Aesthetic: Essays on Postmodern Culture. edited by Hal Foster, Bay Press, Port Townsen (1983).
Studies in Tectonic Culture: The Poetics of Construction in Nineteenth and Twentieth Century Architecture. MIT Press, Cambridge, Mass., 1995.
Álvaro Siza. Complete Works, Phaidon, London, 2000, 
Le Corbusier (World of Art). Thames & Hudson, London, 2001.
Labour, Work and Architecture. Phaidon Press, London, 2002.
"Ando at the Millennium", in Tadao Ando: Light and Water. Book Design by Massimo Vignelli. The Monacelli Press, New York, 2003.  
The Evolution of 20th-Century Architecture: A Synoptic Account. Springer, New York, 2006.
 FRAMPTON K., STRAUVEN F., GÜBLER J. & VERPOEST L., Georges Baines, Ludion, Gent, 2006.
Modern Architecture: A Critical History (World of Art), Thames & Hudson, London, Fifth Edition (2020).
American Masterworks: Houses of the Twentieth & Twenty-First Centuries, edited by David Larkin. Rizzoli, New York (2008). 
Five North American Architects: An Anthology by Kenneth Frampton, Lars Muller, Zurich, (2012).
Genealogy of Modern Architecture: A Comparative Critical Analysis of Built Form, Lars Muller, Zurich, (2014). 
L'altro Movimento Moderno. Edited by Ludovica Molo. Mendrisio Academy Press-Silvana Editoriale, Mendrisio-Milan 2015.

Writings on Kenneth Frampton
 D. Sherer, "Architecture in the Labyrinth. Theory and Criticism in the United States: Oppositions, Assemblage, ANY (1973–1999)," Zodiac 20 (1999), 36–63.
 Jorge Otero-Pailos, "Architecture's Historical Turn: Phenomenology and the Rise of the Postmodern."  University of Minnesota Press, Minneapolis, (2010), 183–250.
 Tom Avermaete, Veronique Patteeuw, Hans Teerds, Lea-Catherine Szacka (eds), Oase #103: Critical Regionalism Revisited, (2019), .
 Karla Cavarra Britton and Robert McCarter, editors, Modern Architecture in the Lifeworld: Essays in Honor of Kenneth Frampton ( Thames & Hudson, 2020, ISBN 9780500343630).

Awards
2022 Thomas Jefferson Foundation Medal in Architecture,
2018 Golden Lion for Lifetime Achievement, Venice Biennale of Architecture
2021 Commander of the Order of the British Empire (CBE); 2021 Queen's Birthday Honours
2014 Lisbon Triennale Millennium BCP Lifetime Achievement Award  
2012  Schelling Architecture Theory Prize
2005 Architectural League of New York President's Medal

References

External links

Images of Kenneth Frampton for Mark Magazine. Photographed by Jeff Barnett-Winsby in 2007
Corringham Extensive detail about Frampton's design in Bayswater, London
Frampton in conversation with Carlos Brillembourg Brooklyn Rail: Arts
Finding aid for the Kenneth Frampton fonds, Canadian Centre for Architecture (digitized items)
A Conversation with Kenneth Frampton: Can There Be a Global Architectural History Today?, Canadian Centre for Architecture

1930 births
American architecture writers
American male non-fiction writers
British architecture writers
English architectural historians
Princeton University faculty
Columbia University faculty
Architecture educators
Academics of the Royal College of Art
Living people
Architecture critics
Preservationist architects
Columbia Graduate School of Architecture, Planning and Preservation faculty
Carnegie Council for Ethics in International Affairs
Commanders of the Order of the British Empire
Members of the American Academy of Arts and Letters